The 1995 German Open was a professional ranking snooker tournament that took place between 3 and 10 December 1995 at the Messe Frankfurt in Frankfurt, Germany. It was the first ranking event held in Germany. John Higgins won the inaugural event defeating Ken Doherty 9–3 in the final.

Summary
The tournament involved the top 16 players in the world ranking who were joined by 16 qualifiers and 4 wild-card players. The four lowest ranked qualifiers played the wild-card players, winning all their four matches and advancing to the last-32. Four of the top-16 players lost in the last-32 round, including Ronnie O'Sullivan and Jimmy White. Further top-ranked players were beaten in the last-16 stage, including Steve Davis, John Parrott and James Wattana. Tony Drago led Stephen Hendry 3–1 but Hendry then won the next four frames to win the match 5–3.

Three Scots, Stephen Hendry, Alan McManus and John Higgins, won their quarter-final matches and were joined in the semi-finals by Ken Doherty. Hendry led Doherty 3–2 but Doherty then won the next four frames to win the match 6–5. In the other semi-final, Higgins beat McManus in the deciding frame after a break of 58. The final was level at three frame each before Higgins won the next six frames to win 9–3 and take the first prize of £40,000. Higgins made a break of 139 in the 11th frame of the final to win the high break prize of £5,000.

Wildcard round
The four lowest ranked qualifiers played four continental players, three from Germany and one from Belgium.

Main draw

Final

References

German Masters
1995 in snooker
1995 in German sport
Sports competitions in Frankfurt